Dictynidae is a family of cribellate, hackled band-producing spiders first described by Octavius Pickard-Cambridge in 1871. Most build irregular webs on or near the ground, creating a tangle of silken fibers among several branches or stems of one plant.

The genus Argyroneta has been placed in a separate family Argyronetidae, but the family is not accepted by the World Spider Catalog and the genus is included in the Dictynidae.

Genera

, the World Spider Catalog accepts the following genera:

Adenodictyna Ono, 2008 — Japan
Aebutina Simon, 1892 — Ecuador, Brazil
Ajmonia Caporiacco, 1934 — Asia, Algeria
Altella Simon, 1884 — Europe, Asia, Algeria
Anaxibia Thorell, 1898 — Asia, Africa
Arangina Lehtinen, 1967 — New Zealand
Archaeodictyna Caporiacco, 1928 — Asia, Europe, Africa
Arctella Holm, 1945 — Asia, North America
Argenna Thorell, 1870 — Asia, North America
Argennina Gertsch & Mulaik, 1936 — United States
Argyroneta Latreille, 1804 — Asia, Europe
Atelolathys Simon, 1892 — Sri Lanka
Banaidja Lehtinen, 1967 — Samoa
Bannaella Zhang & Li, 2011 — China
Brigittea Lehtinen, 1967 — Asia, Italy
Brommella Tullgren, 1948 — Asia, United States, Greece
Callevophthalmus Simon, 1906 — Australia
Chaerea Simon, 1884 — Algeria, Europe
Clitistes Simon, 1902 — Chile
Devade Simon, 1884 — Asia, Algeria, Ukraine
Dictyna Sundevall, 1833 — North America, Asia, South America, Cuba, Panama, Europe, Africa
Dictynomorpha Spassky, 1939 — Asia
Emblyna Chamberlin, 1948 — North America, Asia, Europe, Ecuador
Hackmania Lehtinen, 1967 — Russia, United States
Helenactyna Benoit, 1977 — St. Helena
Hoplolathys Caporiacco, 1947 — Ethiopia
Iviella Lehtinen, 1967 — Canada, United States
Kharitonovia Esyunin, Zamani & Tuneva, 2017 — Iran, Uzbekistan
Lathys Simon, 1884 — Asia, North America, Africa, Europe
Mallos O. Pickard-Cambridge, 1902 — North America, South America, Central America
Marilynia Lehtinen, 1967 — France
Mashimo Lehtinen, 1967 — Zambia
Mexitlia Lehtinen, 1967 — Mexico, United States
Mizaga Simon, 1898 — Senegal
Myanmardictyna Wunderlich, 2017 — Myanmar
Nigma Lehtinen, 1967 — Asia, Africa, Europe, United States
Paradictyna Forster, 1970 — New Zealand
Paratheuma Bryant, 1940 — Oceania, Asia, North America
Penangodyna Wunderlich, 1995 — Malaysia
Phantyna Chamberlin, 1948 — North America, South America
Qiyunia Song & Xu, 1989 — China, Japan
Rhion O. Pickard-Cambridge, 1871 — Sri Lanka
Saltonia Chamberlin & Ivie, 1942 — United States
Scotolathys Simon, 1884 — Algeria, Europe, Israel
Shango Lehtinen, 1967 — South Africa
Sudesna Lehtinen, 1967 — Australia, Asia
Tahuantina Lehtinen, 1967 — Chile
Tandil Mello-Leitão, 1940 — Argentina
Thallumetus Simon, 1893 — South America, Panama, North America
Tivyna Chamberlin, 1948 — United States, Mexico, Cuba
Tricholathys Chamberlin & Ivie, 1935 — North America, Asia
Viridictyna Forster, 1970 — New Zealand

See also
 List of Dictynidae species

References

 
Araneomorphae families
Taxa named by Octavius Pickard-Cambridge